Pediocactus despainii is a rare species of cactus known by the common names Despain's cactus and San Rafael cactus. It is endemic to the state of Utah in the United States, where it is limited to the San Rafael Swell in Emery County, Utah.

There are two populations totalling about 6000 individuals. It is threatened by a number of human activities. It is a federally listed endangered species of the United States.

This cactus was discovered in 1978 by Kim Despain and described to science in 1980. It has sometimes been treated as a subspecies or variety of Pediocactus bradyi but is not generally accepted as such.  It occurs generally near to its closest relative, Pediocactus winkleri.

This egg-shaped or somewhat rounded cactus grows up to 6 centimeters tall and about 9 wide, and generally has no branches. It shrinks in size and disappears under the ground in dry and cold times, making it hard to find for most of the year. Each areole bears up to 15 smooth white spines each measuring a few millimeters long. The plant produces a flower up to 2.5 centimeters long and wide with yellowish or pinkish tepals, the outer ones with purple midstripes. The fruit is green ripening reddish and measures about a centimeter long and wide.

This cactus grows in the San Rafael Swell, a unique geologic feature in central Utah. It is an area with many rare native plants and has a high rate of endemism. The substrate is limestone and siltstone soil originating in the Carmel and Moenkopi Formations. The habitat is grassland with some junipers and pinyon pines.

Threats to this species include poaching, off-road vehicle use, gypsum mining, and petroleum exploration.

References

External links
USDA Plants Profile

Cacti of the United States
Flora of Utah
Endemic flora of the United States
Plants described in 1980
despainii